Riseley is a village in the English county of Berkshire, adjacent to the border with Hampshire. For local government purposes, the village is today within the civil parish of Swallowfield, which in turn is within the unitary authority of Wokingham. Before 1844, Riseley was part of a detached portion, or exclave, of the county of Wiltshire, some 30 miles to the west. The Counties Act of that year resulted in its transfer to Berkshire. Riseley lies on the line of the Roman Road,  Devil's Highway

References 

Villages in Berkshire
Swallowfield